Golędzinów may refer to the following places in Poland:
Golędzinów in Gmina Oborniki Śląskie, Trzebnica County in Lower Silesian Voivodeship (SW Poland)
Other places called Golędzinów (listed in Polish Wikipedia)